The Littleton Islands, (Greenlandic: Pikiuleq) are a group of two small coastal islands, the largest of which is Littleton Island. They are located in the Avannaata municipality, off NW Greenland.

Geography
Littleton is a group of two rocky islets.
McGary Island (McGary Ø) is a much smaller islet, separated from the northwestern shore of the main island by a narrow sound.

Littleton and the nearby area are one of the largest breeding grounds in Greenland for the common eider and have been designated an Important Bird Area.

History
In July 1853, during the Second Grinnell Expedition on the brig Advance Kane built a cairn on Littleton Island.
Kane named one of the adjacent islets Hans Island after Hans Hendrik, the native Greenlandic helper he had with him on the trip.

Later in the expedition Christian Ohlsen died on the Littleton Island on 12 June 1855.

See also 
 List of islands of Greenland

References

External links 
Explanatory notes to the Geological map of Greenland

Uninhabited islands of Greenland